Finnstar may refer to two ships operated by Finnlines:

 , a combination cruise ship/ferry operated 1979–1980
 , a ropax ferry operated from 2006 onwards

Ship names